The Verdugo Hills of Peace Pioneer Cemetery, or Verdugo Hills Cemetery, located in Tujunga, Los Angeles, California, opened in 1922 and closed in 1976.

History
The Los Angeles Office of Historic Resources describes the four-acre cemetery:

By the early 1970s the cemetery had fallen into disrepair, according to the Los Angeles Times, and lost its license in 1976.

Verdugo Hills Cemetery landslide, 1978
On February 10, 1978, after days of torrential rains, a massive landslide occurred in the San Gabriel Mountains foothills above Tujunga.  The result was the unearthing of a large section of the cemetery and corpses being strewn throughout the area.  The rain had been pouring into holes made by gophers and saturated the earth. When the slope gave way, rotted caskets broke open, and their contents were carried away.

According to Thomas Noguchi's book Coroner, some 100 bodies were sent plunging into homes, businesses, and city streets. He even states that one such body was wedged into the entrance of a supermarket. The resulting task of trying to identify the remains and rebury them under their correct markers is documented in the book. When they arrived, bodies were everywhere. Some, he states, were "grotesquely standing upright".

The City of Los Angeles repaired the grounds, but heavy rain unearthed more corpses in 1980.

Restoration 
Friends of Verdugo Hills Cemetery are volunteering every 3rd Saturday of the month in effort to renew and restore the cemetery.

See also
 List of Los Angeles Historic-Cultural Monuments in the San Fernando Valley
 Bob Ronka, Los Angeles City Council member, 1977–81

References

External links
 

Cemeteries in Los Angeles
Sunland-Tujunga, Los Angeles
San Gabriel Mountains
History of the San Fernando Valley
Landslides in the United States
Landslides in 1978
1978 in California
Natural disasters in California
Los Angeles Historic-Cultural Monuments
1922 establishments in California
1976 disestablishments in California